Nelagudda is a village in Dharwad district of Karnataka, India.

Demographics 
As of the 2011 Census of India there were 262 households in Nelagudda and a total population of 1,267 consisting of 677 males and 590 females. There were 130 children ages 0-6.

References

Villages in Dharwad district